Bokaro Steel City College,  established in 1970, is a general degree college in Bokaro, Jharkhand. It offers both under-graduate and post-graduate courses. It is affiliated and also a constituent college of Binod Bihari Mahto Koyalanchal University.

Courses 
Under Graduate
B.A - Hindi, English, Bengali, Philosophy, Political Science, History, Economics and Urdu
B.Sc - Maths, Zoology, Botany, Chemistry and Physics.
B.Com

Post Graduate 
M.A - History 
M.Sc - Maths

Vocational
Biotechnology
B.Ed
BCA
BBA

It also offers Post Graduate degree through Nalanda Open University & Indira Gandhi National Open University

Accreditation
Bokaro Steel City College is a Grade 'B' college accredited by the National Assessment and Accreditation Council (NAAC).

See also
Education in India
Ranchi University
Literacy in India
List of institutions of higher education in Jharkhand

References

External links
http://www.bscitycollege.ac.in

https://www.facebook.com/officialbscitycollege

Colleges affiliated to Binod Bihari Mahto Koyalanchal University
Universities and colleges in Jharkhand
Education in Bokaro Steel City
Educational institutions established in 1970